Deckadance (often referred to as DD) is a DJ console and mixing tool developed by Image-Line software and acquired in 2015 by Gibson. Initially released in May 2007, it operates on Windows and Mac OS X, and comes in a House Edition and Club Edition. The latter has support for timecoded vinyl.

Deckadance can be used as a standalone application or as a VST plugin inside VST-supporting software hosts like Ableton Live. It can host any VST-compliant effect or software synthesizer, and can be controlled by most MIDI controllers.

History
Deckadance was created by Image-Line as a mixing application for DJs. Image-Line worked closely with DJ and programmer Arguru to develop the first version, which was released for Windows in May 2007. After Arguru died in a car accident in June 2007, future versions were worked on by the Image-Line developers Arguru had been cooperating with, many of whom are also DJs. Deckadance was made compatible with Mac OS X after the release of version 1.20.0 in January 2008. The most recent release is version 2.43 from April 28, 2015.

Software overview

System requirements
As of version 1.9, the minimum system requirements for Deckadance on a PC are Windows 7, Vista, or XP (SP2). Hardware requirements consist of 512 MB RAM, 200 MB free hard drive space, and a DirectSound or ASIO compatible soundcard. Also required is either an Intel Pentium III 1 GHz or AMD Athlon XP 1.4 GHz processor. A Mac requires Mac OS X v10.4 (Universal binary), 512 Mb RAM, 200 Mb free hard drive space, and a sound card with CoreAudio drivers. Processor must be either G4 1.5 GHz or Intel Core Duo family.

Versions
Deckadance is available in two different editions. The House Edition can host VST compliant effects and can be controlled via a MIDI controller. The Club Edition contains all of the features of the House Edition, in addition to support for timecoded vinyls.

Features
Among Deckadance features are iTunes integration, an audio synchronization engine that can work in tandem with other VST hosts such as Ableton Live, a detachable Song Manager (SM) that can integrate with iTunes, zPlane Elastique technology, a colored waveform with red to distinguish bass, the ability to time-code your own CD (Club Edition), beat detection, a 2-channel mixer with 3-band EQ, and headphone cueing. As of version 1.9 Deckadance has seven internal performance effects, including LP, HP, BP, Notch, Phaser, Echo, and Low fidelity.
User Interface - Deckadance uses a GUI that slightly resembles that of Image-Line's digital audio workstation FL Studio, which consists of one main window that can expand to fill the entire screen. As of 1.3x there are 6 changeable user skins. As of version 1.9, the program no longer covers the start bar and the icons resemble those of Apple's Aqua graphics.
VST options - Deckadance is designed to work either as a standalone program or as a VSTi 2.4 plugin inside VST-supporting software hosts. For example, Deckadance can be used as a plugin in digital audio workstations such as FL Studio, Ableton Live, Cakewalk Sonar, and Cubase. Deckadance can host VST-compliant effects or software synthesizers, and the VSTs can be controlled with MIDI files, making Deckadance into an 8 track music sequencer.
Samplers - Deckadance has eight integrated sampler banks that can save 1, 2, 4, or 8 beat pattern loops from the decks. The sampling process works in conjunction with a beat detection feature, meaning the samples can be automatically synced to tempo. There is a volume control for sampler slot output, and effects can be layered onto the sample banks. It also allows for the recording and looping of live audio.
ReLooper - The ReLooper slices and re-arranges samples in the playback buffer for either Deck A or Deck B, with the looped region defined by beat markers. Master ReLooper effects include a wha-wha filter, panoramic LFO, ring-modulator, and track-coder that combines a vocoder and low-fi distortion effect.

Controllers
Deckadance can be controlled using a mouse, keyboard, CD system, MIDI controller, or in the case of the Club Edition, timecoded vinyl. The program uses a MIDI auto detection system. Deckadance works with several timecoded vinyl and CDs. Through an "autolearning system," Image-Line claims the program can use essentially all CD and vinyl controllers on the market. When using vinyl, the program distinguishes between "absolute mode", which allows for needle dropping and jump track position from the vinyl, and "relative mode", which doesn't. Both modes allow for scratching and the manual control of playback speed and direction.

Version history

See also

 FL Studio
 Image-Line software
Arguru
 VST plug-in

References

External links

MacOS multimedia software
Audio mixing software
Windows multimedia software
2007 software
DJing
DJ software
DJ equipment